Xenocrasis is a genus of beetles in the family Cerambycidae, containing the following species:

 Xenocrasis anamarcelae Tavakilian & Penaherrera-Leiva, 2003
 Xenocrasis badeni Bates, 1873
 Xenocrasis fereyi Tavakilian & Penaherrera-Leiva, 2003
 Xenocrasis panamensis Giesbert, 1991
 Xenocrasis politipennis (Zajciw, 1971)

References

Rhinotragini